The Countryside Agency was a statutory body set up in England in 1999 with the task of improving the quality of the rural environment and the lives of those living in it. The agency was dissolved in 2006 and its functions dispersed among other bodies.

Formation 
The agency was formed by merging the Countryside Commission and the Rural Development Commission. Its powers were inherited from those bodies. The agency was based in Cheltenham with smaller offices in London and the regions. Total staff numbers were around 600.

Role 
The Agency was a government-funded advisory and promotional body; it owned no land and managed no facilities. Its funding came from the Department for Environment, Food and Rural Affairs (Defra) as an annual budget of around £100 million. The Countryside Agency worked with other bodies, such as local authorities, landowners and other public agencies, to provide grants and advice to conserve the natural beauty of the landscape, promote rural economies and make the countryside more accessible to the public.

The Countryside Agency had special responsibility for designating national parks and Areas of Outstanding Natural Beauty, defining heritage coasts, and establishing long-distance trails for walkers and riders. In 2003, it initiated the designation of England's newest national park, the South Downs National Park. 

In 2004, the Agency partnered with the Countryside Council for Wales to introduce The Countryside Code, an updated version of The Country Code.

Closure 
Following a review by Christopher Haskins of several Government organisations involved in rural policy and delivery, the Natural Environment and Rural Communities Act 2006 dissolved the agency. Those parts of the Countryside Agency charged with environmental activity were merged with English Nature and parts of the Rural Development Service to form Natural England. The socio-economic functions of the Rural Development Commission had already transferred to the Regional Development Agencies in 1999 (they were in their turn replaced by local enterprise partnerships in 2012). The remaining parts of the Countryside Agency, largely research and policy functions, became the Commission for Rural Communities which was abolished in 2013.

See also		
Area of Outstanding Natural Beauty
Heritage coast
Doorstep Greens
Country park
Community forests in England
Rural community vibrancy index

References

Interested parties in planning in England
Defunct public bodies of the United Kingdom
Organizations established in 1999
Organizations disestablished in 2006
English coast and countryside
1999 establishments in England
Rural society in the United Kingdom
Environmental organisations based in the United Kingdom